Mollinedia lamprophylla is a species of plant in the Monimiaceae family of the Laurales oeder.

Description
The plant is endemic to Rio de Janeiro state in southeastern Brazil.

Mollinedia lamprophylla is an understorey species, (formerly) found along stream sides of Atlantic Forest habitats in the Corcovado area.

It is a Critically endangered species on the IUCN Red List.

References

lamprophylla
Endemic flora of Brazil
Flora of Rio de Janeiro (state)
Flora of the Atlantic Forest
Critically endangered flora of South America
Taxonomy articles created by Polbot